The 2014 Trophée d'Or Féminin  was the 18th edition of a women's cycle stage race held in France. The tour was held from 23 August to 27 August, 2014. The tour has an UCI rating of 2.2. The overall winner was Elisa Longo Borghini.

Stages

Stage 1
23 August Saint-Amand-Montrond to Graçay

Stage 2
24 August Mehun-sur-Yèvre to Mehun sur Yèvre (ITT)

Stage 3
24 August Saint-Germain-du-Puy to Saint-Germain-du-Puy

Stage 4
25 August Cosne-Cours-sur-Loire to Cosne Cours Sur Loire

Stage 5
26 August Avord to Avord

Stage 6
27 August Orval to Saint-Amand-Montrond

Classification leadership

References

External links
 Trophee-d-or.fr

International cycle races hosted by France
2014 in French sport
2014 in women's road cycling